This Was a Woman is a 1948 British crime film directed by Tim Whelan and starring Sonia Dresdel, Walter Fitzgerald and Emrys Jones. It was made at the Riverside Studios with sets designed by the art directors Ivan King and Andrew Mazzei. Based on a successful play by former film actress Joan Morgan, its plot concerns an outwardly respectable family dominated by a murderous matriarch.

Plot

Cast

References

Bibliography
 Michael F. Keaney. British Film Noir Guide. McFarland, 2008.

External links
 

1948 films
British crime drama films
1948 crime drama films
Films shot at Riverside Studios
Films directed by Tim Whelan
British films based on plays
20th Century Fox films
Films set in London
Seafaring films
Films about murder
British black-and-white films
1940s English-language films
1940s British films